Jimmie Dale Gilmore is an American country singer, songwriter, actor, recording artist and producer. His discography consists of 9 studio albums, 1 live album, 2 compilations, 2 EPs, and 6 singles. In addition, his songs have been performed on numerous albums by other artists.

Studio albums

Live albums

Compilations

EPs

Singles

As a member of the Flatlanders
 1980: One Road More (Charly)
 1990: More A Legend Than A Band (Rounder) – initially released in 1976 as All American Music in a limited run on 8-track tape 
 1995: "Unplugged" (Sun) – recorded in March, 1972
 2002: Now Again (New West)
 2003: Wheels of Fortune (New West)
 2004: Live at the One Knite: June 8th 1972 (New West)
 2004: Live From Austin TX DVD (New West)
 2009: Hills And Valleys (New West)
 2012: The Odessa Tapes (New West) – unreleased 1972 recordings

As primary artist/song contributor
 1992: various artists – Across The Great Divide: Songs of Jo Carol Pierce (Deja Disc) – track 9, "Reunion"
 1994: various artists – Red Hot + Country (Mercury Nashville) – track 6, "Crazy" (with Willie Nelson)
 1994: various artists – Where Are My Headphones? Live From Studio A. Volume 2 (WCBE) – track 4, "Mobile Line"
 1995: various artists – Texans Live from Mountain Stage (Blue Plate) – track 6, "Just a Wave"
 2001: various artists – Daddy-O Daddy! Rare Family Songs of Woody Guthrie (Rounder) – track 2, "Want to See Me Grow" and track 12, "Tippy Tap Toe" (both with Joe Ely)
 2004: various artists – Merlefest Live! The Best of 2003 (Merlefest) – track 6, "Go to Sleep Alone" 
 2005: various artists – A Tribute to Billy Joe Shaver – Live (Compadre Records) – track 4, "Heart-A-Bustin'" (with Colin Gilmore)

As composer
 1977: Joe Ely – Joe Ely (MCA) – track 8, "Treat Me Like A Saturday Night"
 1978: Joe Ely – Honky Tonk Masquerade (MCA) – track 5, "Tonight I Think I'm Gonna Go Downtown" (co-written with John Reed)
 1981: Joe Ely – Musta Notta Gotta Lotta (MCA) – track 2, "Dallas"
 1985: Nanci Griffith – Poet in My Window (Philo) – track 10, "Tonight I Think I'm Gonna Go Downtown" (co-written with John Reed)
 1990: Joe Ely – Live At Liberty Lunch (MCA) – track 6, "Dallas"
 1994: F.S.K. – The German-American Octet (Return To Sender) German release – track 11, "Dallas"
 1996: James Moody – Return from Overbrook (GRP) – track 6, "There She Goes" (co-written with James Moody)
 1997: Albert & Gage – Jumpin' Tracks (MoonHouse) – track 7, "Now That You're Gone" (co-written with Chris Gage and Paul Pearcy)
 1997: Jack Ingram – Livin' or Dyin' (Rising Tide) – track 12, "Dallas"
 1997: Diane Schuur – Blues for Schuur (GRP) – track 4, "These Blues" (co-written with Charles Brown)
 1998: Erik Moll – Most Of All (Fire Ant) – track 12, "I Love Your Cookin'" (co-written with Erik Moll)
 2006: Laurie Lewis and the Right Hands – The Golden West (HighTone) – track 10, "River Under The Road" (co-written with Ana Egge and Sarah Brown)
 2007: M. Ward – To Go Home (Merge) – track 4, "Headed For A Fall" (co-written with David Hammond and Kevin Welch)
 2009: Dave Alvin – Dave Alvin and the Guilty Women (Yep Roc) – track 8, "River Under The Road"
 2015: Eriksson Delcroix – In Nashville, Tennessee (Waste My Records / Dim Din) Belgium – track 8, "Tonight I Think I'm Gonna Go Downtown" (co-written with John Reed)
 2015: Old Testament – Old Testament (XEMU) – track 5, "Dallas"
 2015: Ruby Amanfu – Standing Still (Arrival) – track 2, "Where You Going" (co-written with David Hammond)

Also appears on
 1978: The Supernatural Family Band – Texas Inlaws (Akashic Records) – vocals on track 4, "Ramblin' Man"
 1979: Butch Hancock – The Wind's Dominion (Rainlight) – vocals
 1981: Butch Hancock – Firewater (Seeks Its Own Level) (Rainlight) – vocals
 1991: various artists – Threadgill's Supper Session (Watermelon) – vocals
 1991: Butch Hancock – Own & Own (Sugar Hill) – vocals
 1997: Hackberry Ramblers – Deep Water (Hot Biscuits) – vocals
 1997: Tom Russell – The Long Way Around (HighTone) vocals on track 4, "Beyond The Blues"
 1998: The Pine Valley Cosmonauts – Salute The Majesty Of Bob Wills – The King Of Western Swing (Bloodshot) – vocals on track 2, "Trouble In Mind"
 2000: John Wesley Harding – The Confessions Of St. Ace (Mammoth) – vocals on track 7, "Bad Dream Baby"
 2006: Butch Hancock – War And Peace (Two Roads) – backing vocals
 2015: Tom Russell – The Rose of Roscrae (Proper) – vocals, guitar

References

External links 
 Jimmie Dale Gilmore's home page
 
 
 

Country music discographies
Discographies of American artists
Folk music discographies